Alfonso Celis Enecoiz, known as Alfonso Celis Jr., (born 18 September 1996) is a Mexican former racing driver.

Career

Karting
Born in Mexico City, Celis entered karting in 2009 and raced until 2012 in the local Mexican karting championships.

Early career
In 2011 Celis made his début in single-seaters, taking part in the LATAM Challenge Series with Megaracing. He finished sixteenth with three top ten finishes in five races.

For 2012, he decided to move in Europe and switch to the Formula BMW Talent Cup. He finished eighth in the grand finale at Motorsport Arena Oschersleben with a podium in the third race of the weekend.

Formula Renault
Celis signed with Fortec Motorsports for the 2013 Formula Renault 2.0 NEC season. He had eleven point-scoring finishes, including podium in the closing race of the season at Zandvoort, finishing fourteenth in the series standings.

Formula Three
During the 2013, Celis with Fortec had one-off entries to British Formula 3 and FIA European Formula 3 championships at Nürburgring and Zandvoort respectively.

GP3 Series
In 2014, Celis graduated to the GP3 Series with Status Grand Prix, joining Nick Yelloly and Richie Stanaway in the team. He will switch to ART Grand Prix for the 2015 season.

Formula One

Celis was signed as a development and free practice driver by the Force India team in Formula One for the 2016 season. He made his first appearance during free practice at the Bahrain Grand Prix.

He made his second appearance on 1 March 2017 on Day 3 of testing at Circuit de Catalunya.

Indy Lights
Celis signed with Juncos Racing to compete in Indy Lights in 2018.

Racing record

Career summary

Complete GP3 Series results
(key) (Races in bold indicate pole position) (Races in italics indicate fastest lap)

† Driver did not finish the race, but was classified as he completed over 90% of the race distance.

Complete World Series Formula V8 3.5 results
(key) (Races in bold indicate pole position) (Races in italics indicate fastest lap)

† Driver did not finish the race, but was classified as he completed over 90% of the race distance.

Complete Toyota Racing Series results
(key) (Races in bold indicate pole position) (Races in italics indicate fastest lap)

Complete Formula One participations
(key) (Races in bold indicate pole position; races in italics indicate fastest lap)

American open-wheel racing results

Indy Lights

IndyCar Series
(key)

References

External links 

 
 

1996 births
Living people
Racing drivers from Mexico City
Mexican racing drivers
Formula BMW drivers
Formula Renault 2.0 NEC drivers
British Formula Three Championship drivers
FIA Formula 3 European Championship drivers
Mexican GP3 Series drivers
World Series Formula V8 3.5 drivers
Toyota Racing Series drivers
Indy Lights drivers
IndyCar Series drivers
ART Grand Prix drivers
LATAM Challenge Series drivers
Status Grand Prix drivers
Tech 1 Racing drivers
AV Formula drivers
Juncos Hollinger Racing drivers
Fortec Motorsport drivers